Moulden is an outer-city suburb of Palmerston, Australia. Its local government area is the City of Palmerston. Moulden is bounded by Tilston Avenue in the north, Temple Terrace in the east, to the south is Chung Wah Terrace and Elrundie Avenue in the west.

Moulden is named after Beaumont Arnold Moulden, who was a representative in the Legislative Council of South Australia.

References

External links
https://web.archive.org/web/20110629040718/http://www.nt.gov.au/lands/lis/placenames/origins/greaterdarwin.shtml#g
http://www.id.com.au/nt/commprofile/default.asp?id=251&gid=6050&pg=1

Suburbs of Darwin, Northern Territory